Mwanga is one of the seven districts of the Kilimanjaro Region of Tanzania. Its administrative seat is the town of Mwanga. The tallest peak in the district is Kindoroko at 2,100m in the North Pare Mountains that are located entirely within the district. According to the 2012 Tanzania National Census, the population of Mwanga District was 131,442.

Administrative subdivisions

Wards 
The Mwanga District is administratively divided into 20 wards:

 Chomvu
 Jipe
 Kifula
 Kighare
 Kileo
 Kilomeni
 Kigonigoni

 Kirongwe
 Kirya
 Kwakoa
 Lang'ata
 Lembeni
 Msangeni

 Mwanga
 Mwaniko
 Ngujini
 Shigatini
 Toloha
 Kivisini
 Mgagao

Notable people from Mwanga District
 Cleopa Msuya, 3rd Tanzanian Prime Minister

Sources
 2002 Population and Housing Census Report - National Bureau of Statistics
 Mwanga District Homepage

References

Districts of Kilimanjaro Region